Cardiff Royal Infirmary (also known as the CRI or YBC) is a hospital in central Cardiff, Wales. It is managed by the Cardiff and Vale University Health Board.

History

The hospital has its origins in the Cardiff Dispensary, which began on Newport Road in 1822. It became the Glamorganshire and Monmouthshire Infirmary and Dispensary in 1837. The current main hospital building facing Glossop Road, Adamsdown, was designed by Edwin Seward and opened in 1883. It became known as King Edward VII Hospital in 1911. During the First World War, the building was requisitioned by the War Office to create the 3rd Western General Hospital, a facility for the Royal Army Medical Corps to treat military casualties. It returned to its current name, Cardiff Royal Infirmary, in 1923. By the time it joined the National Health Service in 1948 it had expanded to become a 500-bed facility.

The hospital ceased operating as a casualty facility in 1999, with the Accident and Emergency department being moved to University Hospital of Wales in the north of the city. Some services were successfully retained at the site after a public campaign.

In the 2010s further medical facilities returned to the site, including a GP service and a sexual health clinic. Mental health and substance misuse facilities were also planned, as well as an out-of-hours pharmacy. £30 million was to be the initial spend, with a second phase including renovation of the hospital's chapel.

In the 2020s work was completed to turn the infirmary's old chapel into a public library, with the nearby Adamsdown Library moving into the building.

In the media
In 2005 the CRI buildings became Albion Hospital, in a two-part episode of the BBC's Doctor Who series, entitled Aliens of London/World War Three.

References

External links
 

Adamsdown
Edwin Seward buildings
Hospitals established in 1822
Hospitals in Cardiff
Grade II listed buildings in Cardiff
1822 establishments in Wales
NHS hospitals in Wales
Cardiff and Vale University Health Board